Sister, also known as My Sister, is a 2021 Chinese coming-of-age drama film directed by Yin Ruoxi and written by .  It stars Zhang Zifeng in the titular lead role, with Xiao Yang, Zhu Yuanyuan, Duan Bowen, and Connor Leong as the other cast  members. It was released in China on 2 April 2021. The film grossed US$52.8 million in its opening weekend, replacing Godzilla vs. Kong as the top film at the weekend Chinese box office.  The film has been received positively, with acclaim for Zhang Zifeng's performance, and has sparked discussion about gender roles and traditional values in modern Chinese society.

Plot 
The film tells a story about the bond between an older sister and her younger brother. When An Ran loses her parents in a traffic accident, she must decide whether to pursue her independence or bring up her 6-year-old half-brother.

The film, which was written and directed by You Xiaoying and Yin Ruoxi, both young female filmmakers, examines themes of traditionalism in Chinese society, patriarchy, the traditional preference for sons over daughters, and filial piety.

Cast

Production 
A small-budget film, Sister was shot in Chengdu from July to September 2020. Like Farewell, My Lad (再见，少年), the film is a collaboration between Zhang Zifeng and Yin Ruoxi.

The main theme song, "Sister", written by Zhang Chu and sung by Roy Wang, was released on 17 March 2021.

Box office
The film was released on 2 April 2021, Qingming Festival weekend. In its opening weekend, the film grossed US$52.8 million, surpassing Godzilla vs. Kong earnings in China the same weekend.  The film's success has drawn comparisons to Hi, Mom, another woman-written and woman-directed family-focused film that exceeded expectations at the box office earlier the same year.

Reception
The film received a 100 percent rating on Rotten Tomatoes based on five reviews, with an average rating of 7.5/10.

The film was well received by critics and audiences upon its release. Its themes sparked discussion about traditional values, gender roles, and the role of women in China. Sociologist Li Yinhe, who studies gender roles in China, called the movie "a profound work based on solid social reality" and noted the conflict between individualism and traditional family values.  Zhang Zifeng's performance was especially cited as the highlight of the film by critics, with some calling it a "breakthrough" and a "tour de force". James Marsh of the South China Morning Post praised the film's acting and its "progressive stance" tackling social issues like gender inequality.

Awards and nominations

References

External links 

 
2021 films
2020s coming-of-age drama films
Chinese coming-of-age drama films
Films about families
Films set in Chengdu
Films shot in Chengdu
Sichuanese-language films
Films about siblings
Films about sexism